Constantine's Wall may refer to:

 Brazda lui Novac, in modern-day Romania
 Devil's Dykes, in modern-day Hungary
 Wall of Constantine (Constantinople), in modern-day Turkey